Raphaulus is a genus of land snails in the family Pupinidae.

Nomenclature
Rhaphaulus is a substitute name for Anaulus L. Pfeiffer, 1855, by Pfeiffer treated as a junior homonym of Anaulus Ehrenberg, 1844 [Diatomacea]. Under Art. 1.4, the name of a plant and of an animal are not homonyms, but Rhaphaulus may be conserved under Art. 23.9.

Species
 Rhaphaulus aborensis Godwin-Austen, 1917
 Rhaphaulus assamicus Godwin-Austen, 1886
 Rhaphaulus bombycinus (L. Pfeiffer, 1855)
 Rhaphaulus chrysalis (L. Pfeiffer, 1854)
 Rhaphaulus franzhuberi Thach, 2021
 Rhaphaulus jalorensis Sykes, 1903
 Rhaphaulus kuekenthali Kobelt, 1897
 Rhaphaulus lorraini L. Pfeiffer, 1856
 Rhaphaulus oakesi Godwin-Austen, 1917
 Rhaphaulus pachysiphon Theobald & Stoliczka, 1872
 Rhaphaulus perakensis E. A. Smith, 1898
 Rhaphaulus pfeifferi Issel, 1874
 Rhaphaulus shimangensis Godwin-Austen, 1917
 Rhaphaulus tonkinensis Páll-Gergely, Hunyadi & Maassen, 2014
 Rhaphaulus yamneyensis Godwin-Austen, 1917
 † Rhaphaulus zhuoi T. Yu, Salvador & Jarzembowski, 2021 
Synonyms
 Rhaphaulus ascendens Sykes, 1903: synonym of Rhaphaulus lorraini L. Pfeiffer, 1856 
 Rhaphaulus assamica Godwin-Austen, 1886: synonym of Rhaphaulus assamicus Godwin-Austen, 1886 (gender agreement)
 Rhaphaulus blanfordi (Benson, 1857): synonym of Streptaulus blanfordi Benson, 1857 (unaccepted combination)
 Rhaphaulus ceramicus Martens, 1864: synonym of Bellardiella ceramica (Martens, 1864) (original combination)

References

External links
 Pfeiffer, L. (1854-1860). Novitates Conchologicae. Series prima. Mollusca extramarina. Beschreibung und Abbildung neuer oder kritischer Land- und Süsswasser-Mollusken. (Mit Einschluss der Auriculaceen)
 Pfeiffer, L. (1855). Descriptions of a new genus and twenty-three new species of Pneumonopoma, from the collection of H. Cuming, Esq. Proceedings of the Zoological Society of London. 23(290): 101–104
 Godwin-Austen, H. H. (1882-1920). Land and freshwater Mollusca of India, including South Arabia, Baluchistan, Afghanistan, Kashmir, Nepal, Burmah, Pegu, Tenasserim, Malay Peninsula, Ceylon, and other islands of the Indian Ocean. Supplementary to Messrs. Theobald and Hanley's Conchologia Indica. London, Taylor & Francis.
 Kobelt W. (1902). Das Tierreich. Eine Zusammenstellung und Kennzeichnung der rezenten Tierformen. 16. Lieferung. Mollusca. Cyclophoridae. Das Tierreich. XXXIX + 662 pp., 1 map.

Pupinidae